Masterminds is a direct to DVD film starring Tila Tequila, Nick Hogan, and Tray Chaney directed by David Keary.

Plot summary
When a businessman's plot to steal from criminals goes south, he learns that he stole from the wrong guy, and when a dangerous drug cartel shows up, all hell breaks loose. A businessman (Trey Chaney) uses his nightclub to target criminals for theft, but gets double crossed by his long-suffering girlfriend (Tila "Tequila" Nguyen) after using her as the bait.

Cast
Tila Tequila as Monae
Nick Hogan as Jay White
Tray Chaney as Rocket

References

External links

American action films
American independent films
2013 films
2013 action films
2013 independent films
2010s English-language films
2010s American films